Social finance is a category of financial services which aims to leverage private capital to address challenges in areas of social and environmental need. Having gained popularity in the aftermath of the 2008 Global Financial Crisis, it is notable for its public benefit focus. Mechanisms of creating shared social value are not new, however, social finance is conceptually unique as an approach to solving social problems while simultaneously creating economic value. Unlike philanthropy, which has a similar mission-motive, social finance secures its own sustainability by being profitable for investors. Capital providers lend to social enterprises who in turn, by investing borrowed funds in socially beneficial initiatives, deliver investors measurable social returns in addition to traditional financial returns on their investment.

Consensus has yet to be established on a formal definition of social finance due to lacking clarity around its scope and intent, however, it is said to include elements of impact investing, socially responsible investing and social enterprise lending. Investors include charitable foundation, retail investors and institutional investors. Notable examples of social finance instruments are Social Impact Bonds and Social Impact Funds.

Since the 2008 Financial Crisis the social finance industry has been experiencing a period of accelerated growth as shifts in investor sentiment has led to greater demand for ethically responsible investment alternatives by retail investors. Mainstream sources of capital have entered the market as a result including Deutsche Bank which, in 2011, became the first commercial bank to raise a social investment fund.

New research in the field calls for increasing the role of government in social finance to help overcome the challenges which the industry currently faces including the struggle to produce desirable returns for investors, high start-up and regulatory costs, neglect from mainstream banks and lacking access to retail investors. Proponents of social finance argue that until these gaps are addressed, mass participation in social finance will be prevented.

Origin 
The history of social finance has its origins in 20th Century neoliberal economics and the ideas that it proposed, such as an emphasis on the role of the free-market in society. The concept itself first came in to use in the 1970s in the United States where it emerged as an innovative approach to solve social problems while creating economic value. The appeal to government was clear: access to swathes of private capital to fund social programs at a time of deep austerity and retrenchment of state programs under neoliberal politics. In 1977 in the United States, the Community Reinvestment Act provided the impetus for financial institutions to invest in under-served local regions and marginalised sectors of the economy, furthering state transfers of wealth to the private sector. This spawned a plethora of community Development Financial Institutions which deployed significant amounts of capital in affordable housing, renewable energy and financial inclusion across the United States. Furthermore, many prominent foundations including the Ford, Rockefeller and MacArthur Foundations have actively invested their endowments in a manner that aligns with this practice of mission-related investing.

Some scholars contest that social finance has its origins in Islamic finance, which was practiced by the sharia-compliant Islamic economies of the 1960s and which is characterised by socially responsible investment.

Market structure 

The social finance ecosystem is composed of four key groups. These include:

 Investors: Investors, or capital providers, serve as the initial and primary source of capital in social finance. Examples include retail investors, high net worth individuals, pension funds, charitable foundations and private foundations.
 Social enterprises: Social enterprises represent the demand for investment in social finance. They absorb the capital invested by group 1, reinvest this money in various socially beneficial initiatives, or social investments, and finally deliver investors twin social and financial returns on their investment. Examples include nonprofit organisations such as the Bill and Melinda Gates Foundation. 
 Social finance institutions: Social finance institutions act as financial intermediaries by linking the supply and demand of capital. They are responsible for raising funds from the investors of group 1, pooling these funds and redistributing them to the social enterprises of group 2. Social enterprises are ranked by profitability and preference is given to organisations with strong track records of effective social service.
 Intermediaries: Intermediaries facilitate and oversee the myriad of connections between groups 1-3. They include regulators, trade groups and service providers.

Scale of operations 
Research reveals that the term social finance is familiar mainly to people working in the niche sector of the financial services industry. Since the Global Financial Crisis of 2008, however, the social finance industry has been experiencing a period of accelerated growth and institutional uptake. For example, in 2011 Deutsche Bank became the first commercial bank to raise a social investment fund, in 2012 Goldman Sachs floated Social Impact Bonds in the USA and in 2012 the European Investment Fund made a direct investment into the UK social finance marketplace.

Explanation of the post-GFC popularisation of social finance is the subject of extensive academic research. Social theorist Bill Maurer explains it as the result of shifts in investor sentiment in the aftermath of the Financial Crisis. Social finance, through its innovative approach to solving social problems while creating economic value, has met the need of disaffected retail investors who seek ethical investment alternatives following revelations in the aftermath of the Financial Crisis of widespread unethical business practices by mainstream corporations in pursuit of profit. As a result, Maurer suggests, mainstream corporations looking to rebuild their reputations are now entering the market, bringing with them significant inflows of capital and investment.

One study, which provides a statistical analysis of participation, satisfaction and retention rates in the European social finance market, suggests that the GFC came and went at a time when social finance organisations were beginning to develop track records that demonstrated their market feasibility. Geobey and Harji, in their anecdotal study of social finance in the post-GFC United States, document similar findings in the North American case. In their study, which synthesises interviews with executives from North American social finance organisations, confirms that demonstration of commercial viability by current actors in the North American social finance market since 2008 has proven themselves to mainstream financiers, enabled the scaling up of operations, created a ‘signalling effect’ that has attracted new investment and ultimately staved off existential questions that have been asked of the social finance industry.

Proponents of social finance Kent Baker and John Nofsinger claim that these trends of institutionalisation will lead to the legitimisation of the social finance industry, give way to the widespread institutional uptake of social finance and ultimately embed social finance as a mainstream asset class of financial investments among the likes of stocks and bonds. Several unfavourable trends have also become apparent, however, including uneven uptake across the ecosystem, and key challenges remain including the struggle to produce desirable returns for investors, high start-up and regulatory costs and lacking access to retail investors. Baker and Nofsinger argue that until these gaps are addressed, mass participation in social finance will be prevented.

Examples

Social Impact Bonds 

Of all forms of social finance, the most used and developed is the Social Impact Bond (SIB). SIB’s are structured financial instruments that raise private capital to fund prevention and early intervention programs in areas of pressing social need, reducing the need for expensive safety net services down the line. Investors provide upfront capital to fund these programs and receive a prearranged amount of money (including the principal plus some financial return) if performance results are achieved.

Funds from SIB’s are spent on services like counselling, health care and detention with the aim of reducing the need for these services in the first place. Proceeds from the savings are used to reward investors for facilitating the process. Unlike conventional bonds, however, SIB’s operate on a pay-for-performance basis in which bondholders are repaid only if the program’s outcome targets are achieved.

Social Investment Funds 
Social Investment Funds (SIFs) pool funds from investors to provide not-for-profit organisations with “patient working capital” (funding with a longer-term repayment schedule). The Social Innovation Fund is a well-known example of a SIF. Through a competitive process, it awards grants of up to $10 million per year to organisations with strong track records of effective social service.

Comparisons with other forms of social welfare enhancement 
Efforts to create mechanisms to allocate capital for combined social and economic value creation are not new. Social finance is conceptually a very different approach to social welfare enhancement, however, in that, by combining the ideas of neoliberal markets (in creating a profit and financial return) with taking care of the social need of society (in the way that a charity would), social finance secures its own sustainability by being profitable for those who fund these organisations. It is funded by investors, who receive return on their investment, rather than donors, who forgo their contribution at the time of donation. The ‘blended’ social and financial returns are a defining characteristic of social finance and distinguish it from related practices such as not-for-profit investing, charity and philanthropy.

Comparison with Corporate Social Responsibility 
Leading scholars in the field of social innovation such as Stephen Sinclair, Neil McHugh and Michael Roy question the need for social finance given extensive existing frameworks that govern corporate social responsibility in capital markets. Their critical analysis of the efficacy of social impact bonds concludes that social finance draws capital away from productive investment opportunities and exacerbates allocative inefficiencies caused by excessive existing government regulation. Separate studies reaffirm these claims and argue that improved efficiencies are needed before social finance is marketized.

Proponents of social finance concede that while its intent overlaps with that of corporate social responsibility, social finance provides a means for greater direct investment in addressing social challenges whereas existing corporate governance frameworks work at the fringe. Dr Othmar Lehner, Associate Professor of Social Enterprise at the University of Oxford Saïd Business School, states that while traditional financial institutions typically prioritise profitability and regard their societal impact only so much as regulation requires, social finance enterprises set social objectives as the first goal of their capital allocation strategies, channelling investors’ funds directly to organisations that prioritise projects with socially positive outcomes. In his opening chapter in the Routledge Handbook of Social and Sustainable Finance he proposes social finance as a new source of capital to supplement existing sources, such as charitable donations and philanthropic grants, which have historically been the main source of financing social change from poverty alleviation to international development and income inequality. Social theorists Jed Emerson and Alex Nicholls reaffirm these claims by suggesting that social finance provides the greater direct investment required to address various social challenges and fill the capital gap that currently exists given that many problems in these areas of social need have increased in severity, complexity and scale, while charitable donations are on the decline.

Challenges and future direction 
The social finance industry faces several headwinds including the struggle to produce desirable returns for investors, high start-up and regulatory costs, neglect from mainstream banks and lacking access to retail investors, an area which is believed to have perhaps the most demand. Furthermore, although the industry has matured, it has done so at an uneven pace across its ecosystem, as evidenced in the United States in particular. While capital flows and trust between suppliers (investors) and demanders (social finance institutions) of capital are improving, regulatory developments have lagged behind. One study concedes that the rapid growth of social finance in the 21st Century has exposed its self-regulatory capacity, the need to strengthen governance mechanisms, and the need to develop sophisticated intermediaries to link capital and opportunities. The source suggests that institutional uptake of social finance will be held back by these headwinds and, unless the gaps are addressed, the social finance industry will be unable to keep pace with its current rate of growth in the future.

Consensus of experts in the field maintains that the role of government in social finance will be central to addressing the challenges that the sector currently faces. Sustainability strategist Coro Strandberg proposes six public policy changes to address these challenges. They include:

 Legislative reform: Recast legislation from a for-profit/not-for-profit framework to a sustainable and effective framework
 Tax incentives: Offer tax incentives to encourage investments in social finance
 Capacity building: Create a framework that permits organisations to build capacity through capital retention
 Community investment: Create an enabling environment for trustees to consider community investments consistent with their fiduciary duty
 Regulatory reform': Create a permissive framework for foundation to support social finance
 Formalised sustainability plans:''' Negotiate an allocation from the New Deal for Cities for the articulation of environmental, social, cultural and economic goals into municipal sustainability plans and checklists

See also
 Social enterprise
Impact investing
 Microfinance
 Social impact bond
 Socially-responsible investing

References

 Further reading 

 Canada, Department of Employment and Social Development. Harnessing the power of social finance. 2 May 2013, pp. 10–26.
 Canada, Planned Lifetime Advocacy Network. “Exploring new sources of investment for social transformation.” Social Capital Market Roundtable. By Coro Strandberg, 13 Mar 2006, pp. 6–8.
 Emerson, Jed, and Nicholls, Alex. “Social finance: Capitalizing social impact.” Social Finance, edited by Jed Emerson, et al., Oxford University Press, 2015, pp. 1–45.
 Geobey, Sean, and Harji, Karim. “Social Finance in North America.” Global Social Policy, vol. 14, 2014, pp. 274–77.
 Kramer, Mark, and Porter, Michael. “The big idea: Creating shared value.” Harvard Business Review, vol. 89, pp. 2–14.
 Lehner, Othmar M. “The Architecture of Social Finance.” Routledge Handbook of Social and Sustainable Finance, edited by Gadaf Rexhepi, Routledge, 2017, pp. 35–49.
 Maurer, Bill. “The Disunity of Finance: Alternative Practices to Western Finance.” The Oxford Handbook of the Sociology of Finance, edited by Karin Cetina, et al., Oxford University Press, 2012, pp. 413–431.
 Mulgan, Geoff. “Measuring social value.” Stanford Social Innovation Review, vol. 38, pp. 38–43.
 Organisation for Economic Co-operation and Development. “New investment approaches for addressing social and economic challenges.” Science, Technology and Industry Policy Papers. By Karen Wilson, 1 Jul 2014, pp. 41–81.
 United States, Center for American Progress. Social Finance: A Primer. Understanding Innovation Funds, Impact Bonds, and Impact Investing. 5 Nov 2013.
 "What is Sustainable Finance?: The Economist Explains." The Economist'', 17 Apr 2018, pp. 23–26.

Social finance
Investment
Corporate social responsibility
Economy and the environment